Diane McKnight (born March 22, 1953) is a professor of civil, environmental, and architectural engineering at the University of Colorado Boulder and a fellow at the Institute of Arctic and Alpine Research (INSTAAR). McKnight is a founding principal investigator of the National Science Foundation's Long-Term Ecological Research (LTER) program in the McMurdo Dry Valleys of Antarctica.

Early life and education 
McKnight received a BS in mechanical engineering (1975), MS in civil engineering (1978), and her PhD in environmental engineering in 1979, all from Massachusetts Institute of Technology.

Career and impact 
After completing her graduate studies, McKnight began working for the US Geological Survey (USGS) as a research scientist for the Water Resources Division. As part of her work with USGS, she conducted research on lakes in the blast zone of Mount St. Helens in 1980.

In 1996, McKnight transitioned to the University of Colorado – Boulder, where she became one of the founding principal investigators of the McMurdo Dry Valleys Long Term Ecological Research Program in Antarctica's McMurdo Dry Valleys. While continuing to conduct extensive research in Antarctica, she also conducts research in the Rocky Mountains, where she develops interactions with state and local groups involved in mine drainage and watershed issues. In total McKnight has authored or co-authored over 300 publications.

McKnight has been nationally and internationally recognized for her "seminal" and "visionary" contributions to Antarctic science. McKnight Creek in Taylor Valley, Victoria Land is named after her. She is also responsible for naming Antarctic features, including Furlong Creek.

Her contributions to major scientific institutions include service on several National Research Council committees; service on the Water, Science and Technology Board and the Polar Research Board; and tenure as president of the American Geophysical Union Biogeosciences section. In 2015 she was awarded CU-Boulder's Distinguished Research Lectureship, which the university cites as being "among the highest honors bestowed by the faculty upon a faculty member at CU-Boulder". McKnight also was founding editor of the Journal of Geophysical Research: Biogeosciences.

Awards and honors 
 Robert E. Horton Medal, American Geophysical Union, 2021
 John Dalton Medal, European Geosciences Union, 2015
 Distinguished Research Lectureship, CU-Boulder, 2015
 Hydrologic Science Award, American Geophysical Union, 2014 
 Elected member, National Academy of Engineering, 2012
 Fellow of the American Association for the Advancement of Science, 2009
 Walter B. Langbein Lectureship, American Geophysical Union, 2005
 Fellow, American Geophysical Union, 2004
 Meritorious Service Award, U.S. Geological Survey, 1995

Selected works 
 McKnight, Diane M., et al. "Spectrofluorometric characterization of dissolved organic matter for indication of precursor organic material and aromaticity". Limnology and Oceanography. 46.1 (2001): 38-48.
 Aiken, George R., et al. Humic Substances in Soil, Sediment, and Water: Geochemistry, Isolation and Characterization. John Wiley & Sons, 1985.
 Tranvik, Lars J., et al. "Lakes and reservoirs as regulators of carbon cycling and climate". Limnology and Oceanography. 54.6 part 2 (2009): 2298-2314.

References

External links 
 
 Diane McKnight on Google scholar

American women scientists
1953 births
Living people
University of Colorado Boulder faculty
MIT School of Engineering alumni
United States Geological Survey personnel
American Antarctic scientists
Women Antarctic scientists
21st-century American women